was a village located in Kitaazumi District, Nagano Prefecture, Japan.

As of 2003, the village had an estimated population of 1,199 and a density of 35.33 persons per km². The total area was 33.94 km².

On January 1, 2006, Yasaka, along with the village of Miasa (also from Kitaazumi District), was merged into the expanded city of Ōmachi.

Dissolved municipalities of Nagano Prefecture
Ōmachi, Nagano